Archie Sharp (born 14 April 1995) is an English professional boxer who has held the WBO European junior-lightweight title since 2018.

Professional career
Sharp made his professional debut on 17 July 2015, scoring a first-round technical knockout (TKO) victory over Laszlo Fekete at the York Hall in London.

After compiling a record of 13–0 (7 KOs) he faced Lyon Woodstock on 6 October 2018 at the Morningside Arena in Leicester, with Woodstock's WBO European junior-lightweight title on the line. Sharp knocked Woodstock to the canvas in the opening round en route to a unanimous decision (UD) victory over ten rounds. All three judges scored the bout 96–93, awarding Sharp the WBO European title. Following a second-round TKO win against Sergio Gonzalez in April 2019, Sharp successfully defended his title on three occasions that year; a UD over Jordan McCorry in July; a fourth-round TKO against Declan Geragthy in September; and a UD over Artjom Ramlavs in December.

Sharp's sole fight of 2020 was against his countryman Jeff Ofori on 15 August 2020. He won the closely contested bout by a narrow unanimous decision, with referee and judge Marcus McDonnell scoring the fight 96-95 for Sharp.

Sharp was booked to fight Diego Andrade for the vacant WBO Global junior-lightweight title on 10 July 2021. He won the fight by unanimous decision, with two judges scoring the bout 97-93 in his favor, while the third judge scored it 99-93 for Sharp. Sharp made his first WBO Global title defense against Alexis Boureima Kabore on 29 October 2021. He won the fight by a dominant unanimous decision, with all three judges scoring the fight 100-90 for him.

Professional boxing record

References

External links

Living people
1995 births
English male boxers
Sportspeople from Kent
Super-featherweight boxers
Lightweight boxers